Dihydrocuscohygrine is an alkaloid that has been isolated from coca leaves.

See also
 Cuscohygrine
 Pseudotropine

References

Alkaloids found in Erythroxylum coca